Guianacara is a small genus of cichlid fish endemic to freshwater habitats in the Guiana Shield in South America. They mostly live in moderately flowing clear- or blackwater rivers and streams, but also occur in lagoons that are seasonally flooded. They are typically found over bottoms consisting of sandy patches intermixed with large rocks.

The different species all have a dark line through the eye (its strength varies), but the adults can be separated by the appearance of the dark bar or spot on the mid-body. They mainly feed on small invertebrates.

Species
The seven recognized species in this genus are:

 Guianacara cuyunii López-Fernández, Taphorn & Kullander, 2006
 Guianacara dacrya Arbour & López-Fernández, 2011
 Guianacara geayi (Pellegrin, 1902)
 Guianacara oelemariensis Kullander & Nijssen, 1989
 Guianacara owroewefi Kullander & Nijssen, 1989  
 Guianacara sphenozona Kullander & Nijssen, 1989
 Guianacara stergiosi López-Fernández, Taphorn & Kullander, 2006

References 

Geophagini
Fish of South America
Cichlid genera
Taxa named by Sven O. Kullander
Taxa named by Han Nijssen